The Malmö MFI-10 Vipan (en: Peewit) was a four-seat light utility monoplane designed and built in Sweden by Malmö Flygindustri. Only three aircraft were built and the type did not enter quantity production.

Design and development
Designed to meet a requirement for both a civil and military utility aircraft the MFI-10 was a braced high-wing monoplane with a fixed tailwheel landing gear and a cabin for a pilot and three passengers. The aircraft made extensive use of aluminum honeycomb structure, with the wings, tail and rear fuselage made of honeycomb and the forward fuselage of welded steel tubes. The prototype was powered by a nose-mounted 160 hp (119 kW) Lycoming O-320 engine and first flew in 1961. It was followed by two military prototypes for the Swedish Army designated MFI-10B. The MFI-10B had a 180 hp (134 kW) Lycoming O-360-A1A engine and first flew on 27 June 1962. Plans to produce a variant with a more powerful engine did not proceed and the aircraft did not enter quantity production.

The German company Rhein-Flugzeugbau (RFB) proposed new versions of the MFI-10 in 1993, with either tailwheel or tricycle landing gears.

Variants
MFI-10 Vipan
Civil prototype with a 160hp (119kW) Lycoming O-320 engine, one built.
MFI-10B Vipan
Military prototype with a 180hp (134kW) Lycoming O-360-A1A engine, two built, designated MFI Fpl54.
MFI-10C Vipan
Proposed by RFB - military version with tailwheel undercarriage and powered by  O-360-A engine.
MFI-10D Phönix
Proposed by RFB - civil version with nosewheel undercarriage.

Operators

Swedish Army

Specifications (MFI-10B)

Notes

References
 

 

1960s Swedish military utility aircraft
MFI-10
Single-engined tractor aircraft
High-wing aircraft
Aircraft first flown in 1961